Terglyphus is a genus of mites in the family Acaridae.

Species
 Terglyphus padrtorum Samsinak, 1965

References

Acaridae